Frederico Lapenda is a movie producer and fight promoter who is one of the founders of the sport of Mixed Martial Arts (MMA).  Lapenda is credited, along with Ultimate Fighting Championship co-creator Art Davie, as being responsible for the globalization of MMA.  Lapenda is also president of the Beverly Hills Film Festival Grand Jury, and has produced films, MMA events and documentaries. Two of them, Kidnapping and Unknown Distance, were eligible for Oscar nominations. Lapenda received a national honor for his lifelong accomplishments, when he was appointed a Tourism Ambassador by the President of Brazil, placing him among fellow appointees Ronaldinho, Vitor Belfort, Renzo Gracie and Romero Britto. One of his most significant accomplishments was the creation of Allies of the Amazon, a children's book about four super-powered talking animals who protect the Amazon rainforest, with Marvel Comics founder Stan Lee.

In 2011, Lapenda produced the first Pay Per View by YouTube on his Fight Game Channel, broadcasting a Moscow event worldwide. In 1998 he became the first producer to broadcast MMA on US TV on channel 22 in Los Angeles. In 1997 he introduced PPV to Brazil with his World Vale Tudo Championship III (WVC) event in São Paulo and in 1997 his WVC event aired on US PPV, making him just the fourth producer to promote MMA on US PPV.

Globalization of MMA 
The globalization of MMA would happen in 1995 when Lapenda, transplanted to Los Angeles, was looking to take MMA outside of the U.S. and to build a star that would attract the followers of all styles. He brought Brazilian fighter, Marco Ruas to the U.S. in UFC VI to be introduced to the crowd and then to fight and win UFC VII. During this time he created Ruas Vale Tudo, the prototype MMA cross-training style that is still emulated to this day.

Lapenda also created the Brazilian Dream Team, which was to have all the major Brazilian fighters training together in Luta Livre, Brazilian Jiu-Jitsu, wrestling, and muay Thai under Carlson Gracie. Lapenda actually opened an academy in Los Angeles in 1995 near UCLA in Westwood, California, for Carlson Gracie and Vitor Belfort to teach at. The Brazilian Dream Team eventually became the Brazilian Top Team and was composed of those same people Lapenda brought together under Carlson to cross-train.

In 1996, Lapenda decided to take the sport global and created his own fighting event, the World Vale Tudo Championship (WVC), which debuted at NK Hall Bay auditorium in Japan. That first event had an eight-man tournament plus a super fight. Among the fighters were three of the six UFC champions including Steve Jennum, Oleg Taktarov and Marco Ruas. This was the first time a foreigner had promoted a martial arts fight in Japan and also the first time a UFC champion fought in Japan.

From there, Lapenda followed up WVC Japan with numerous other international shows. The WVC during the second half of the '90s was the leading international event and created such stars as Pedro Rizzo, Mark Kerr, Heath Herring, Igor Vovchanchyn, and many others. All of these WVC fighters would go on to fight in either the UFC or for Pride in Japan, which would attract the largest audiences in the world through the foundation laid by Lapenda's WVC Japan.

During the 90's, Lapenda took MMA to Japan, Israel, Russia, Brazil, the Netherlands, Aruba, Jamaica, and Ukraine and produced over 100 shows. In 1998, he produced the first West Coast cable broadcast of mixed martial arts (Combate Mortal) on KWHY TV. Lapenda also broke new ground by co-producing two of the first MMA theatrical documentaries, The Smashing Machine (HBO, 2002) and Rites of Passage: The Rebirth of Combat Sports (PPV, 2001), which are still considered the industry gold standard. He introduced pay-per-view to Brazilian television and his WVC was just the fourth MMA show to ever air on US PPV.

Lapenda was acknowledged as a "true visionary" by Grappling magazine, which ran a two-part 12-page article on his life and accomplishments, and was also featured on the cover of Gladiator magazine in 2007 and publicly honored, along with UFC creator Art Davie, as one of the two men who created MMA. He created the Golden Glory fighting team with Bas Boon in 1999. Golden Glory dominated the worlds of K-1 and MMA for 10 years with fighters such as Semmy Schilt, Alistair Overeem, Gokhan Saki, and many others.

Paradigm Pictures
In 2002, Lapenda became a filmmaker/producer at Peter Guber's Mandalay Entertainment Group and then founded Paradigm Pictures. He has produced four highly rated programs for Fox Files, including Russian Night Life and Amsterdam: The Red Light District. In addition he produced Ultimate Fighting Around the World and Underground Fighting in California. His feature film credits as producer includes USS Indianapolis and Rage.

References

External links
 
 Variety - Rage Nicolas Cage
 Variety - USS Indianapolis Nicolas Cage
 Variety - Frederico Lapenda Creates Mandalay Lone Runner
 Hollywood Reporter - Brazil's Major Players In The Entertainment Industry
 Hollywood Reporter - Bad Guys Wins Three Awards At The Beverly Hills Film Festival
 Hollywood Reporter - Sequestro Documentary Becomes Eligible For An Oscar
 Veja Magazine - Amazon Graphic Novel
 Epoca Magazine Frederico Lapenda's Journey
 Caras Magazine - Frederico Lapenda Success Story
 https://variety.com/2005/film/news/brazilian-flies-u-s-banner-1117925410/ Variety - Lapenda Forms Paradigm Pictures

American film producers
Living people
Year of birth missing (living people)